Trebnja Gorica (in older sources also Trebna Gorica) is a small settlement near the source of the Krka River in the Municipality of Ivančna Gorica in central Slovenia. The area is part of the historical region of Lower Carniola. The municipality is now included in the Central Slovenia Statistical Region.

Geography
  The entrance to Krka Cave lies northwest of the village.

Water boatman (Micronecta poweri) specimens have been discovered near the village, in Višnjica Creek.

References

External links
Trebnja Gorica on Geopedia

Populated places in the Municipality of Ivančna Gorica